Edward Ball (November 6, 1811 – November 22, 1872) was a two-term U.S. Representative from Ohio from 1853 to 1857.

Biography 
Born in Fairfax County, Virginia, near Falls Church, Ball attended the village school.  He moved to Ohio and located near Zanesville, where he engaged in agricultural pursuits.  He served as deputy sheriff of Muskingum County in 1837 and 1838 and sheriff from 1839 to 1843.  He served as member of the Ohio House of Representatives from 1845 to 1849, and became editor of the Zanesville Courier in 1849.

Congress 
Ball was elected as a Whig to the Thirty-third Congress and reelected as an Opposition Party candidate to the Thirty-fourth Congress (March 4, 1853 – March 3, 1857).  In Congress, he served as chairman of the Committee on Public Buildings and Grounds (Thirty-fourth Congress).  He was not a candidate for renomination in 1856.

Later career 
After his tenure in Congress, Ball studied law, was admitted to the bar in 1860, and commenced practice in Zanesville.  He served as delegate to the Republican National Convention at Chicago in 1860, and as Sergeant at Arms of the House of Representatives in the Thirty-seventh Congress from 1861 to 1863.

He resumed the practice of law, and was again a member of the State house of representatives from 1868 to 1870.

Death
He was accidentally killed by a railroad train near Zanesville, Ohio, on November 22, 1872.  He is interred in Greenwood Cemetery.

References

Sources

1811 births
1872 deaths
People from Fairfax County, Virginia
Whig Party members of the United States House of Representatives from Ohio
Opposition Party members of the United States House of Representatives from Ohio
Sergeants at Arms of the United States House of Representatives
Members of the Ohio House of Representatives
People from Zanesville, Ohio
Ohio sheriffs
Railway accident deaths in the United States
Accidental deaths in Ohio
19th-century American politicians